Lucky Summer Lady is the debut studio album by the Japanese jazz fusion group T-Square, who were then known as The Square. It was released on September 21, 1978.

Track listing 
Sources

Recording personnel 
Sources
Masahiro Andoh - lead guitar
Takeshi Itoh - alto and tenor saxophone, flute
Junko Miyagi - piano, keyboards, vocals
Akihiko Miyasaka - keyboards, vocals
Shirō Sagisu - keyboards
Kiyohiko Semba - percussion and vocals
Yuhji Mikuriya - rhythm guitar
Yuhji Nakamura - bass and Yamaha Synthesizer
Michael S. Kawai - drums and percussion

References

T-Square (band) albums
1978 debut albums